Societe Generale de Banque au Liban S.A.L. (SGBL, Arabic: بنك سوسيتيه جنرال في لبنان), founded in 1953, is a Lebanese bank. It is a subsidiary of SGBL Group, which operates in Lebanon, and offers banking services in the Middle East (Lebanon, Jordan), the Gulf (United Arab Emirates) and Europe (Cyprus, France and Monaco).

SGBL offers a range of banking services to individuals and companies.

Antoun Sehnaoui is the company's Chairman, CEO and main shareholder. The other main shareholders are Kafinvest Holding Lebanon Company SAL, Société Générale (France) and NSKINV Ltd.

Société Générale (France) holding 
In 2020, local reports verified that Société Générale (France) did not divest from its holding in SGBL after an allegation that SGBL is a "troubled and mismanaged bank." Société Générale (France) had set aside provisions to compensate for the downgrade in Lebanon's credit rating for the previous fiscal year because the downgrade caused a decrease in the value of its holding in SGBL.

CSR & Sustainable Development  
Corporate Social Responsibility (CSR) and Sustainable Development have been an integral part of SGBL’s identity and they are based on four pillars: Sports, Culture, Society and Economic Growth. SGBL is also aligned with the 2030 Sustainable Development Goals of the United Nations undertaking and supporting many initiatives to positively contribute toward Sustainable Development Goals 4, 5, 8, 11 and 17.

See also 

 List of Banks in Lebanon
 Banque du Liban
 Bank Audi
 Crédit Libanais
 Fransabank
 Economy of Lebanon

References 

Banks of Lebanon